William Henry Cooper ( –  13 April 1909) was an Anglo-Irish priest of the Church of England who served as a missionary in Australia and New Zealand and Canada. He founded St Luke's Hospital for the Clergy in London and the College of St. Barnabas in Lingfield, Surrey.

Early years
As A.Tindal Hart writes in his memoir, "William Henry Cooper's origins are obscure. An Irish-man from the county of Tipperary in Southern Ireland, he undoubtedly sprang from an Anglo-Irish family with strong Church and Military tradition".

Cooper was born in Dublin, Ireland, the son of gentleman William Cooper and Catherine Elizabeth LeClerc, daughter of Pierre Abercrombie LeClerc. Upon leaving school, he and his younger brother, Charles Abercrombie Cooper, went straight into the Army. William was commissioned as Ensign in the 2nd Royal Cheshire Militia on 5 May 1855, shortly after his marriage by licence to Anna Matilda Wilson. By the time he had become a Lieutenant his thoughts were turning away from the prospect of a military career towards becoming ordained into the Church of Ireland.

Missionary work

On 23 December 1860 he was ordained deacon by Bishop Robert Daly of Cashel in Waterford. Soon after being ordained a priest he wrote: "I determined to offer myself for missionary work." The Society for the Propagation of the Gospel accepted the new missionary, who after an interview with Bishop Perry of Melbourne sailed with his wife for Australia in April 1864. Here he held services, visited families, built two churches and a parsonage, and collected enough money for (and laid the foundations of) yet another church. Hussey Macartney, Dean and Archdeacon of Melbourne, wrote:
"I have known the Revd W. H. Cooper for about five years. On his arrival in this colony, in the absence of the Lord Bishop, he undertook, at my request, what everyone regarded as the most arduous and difficult post in the diocese....He is active, zealous, laborious and enterprising, and is capable of gaining great influence over those with whom he comes into contact."

In June 1870, Cooper began yet another strenuous ministry in the Anglican Diocese of Christchurch, New Zealand. The considerable dangers involved in this new work are fully revealed by his reports, in one of which he commented: 
"The many dangerous rivers were not bridged, and travelling on horseback, which was the only way of getting about the country, was attended by many dangers. I was three times swept off my horse fording the rivers, twice providentially preserved from being drowned."
Eventually he found that he could no longer ride a horse, and his doctor advised him to seek a change of climate, so in 1877 he returned to Australia. However, with an ailing wife, and worn out by his own labours, his thoughts naturally turned back to his native land.

At Home once more, Cooper became an SPG deputation preacher and lecturer. But his restless spirit would not let him rest for long in such a humdrum occupation, so in 1883, he gladly volunteered for a special SPG mission to Canada. His tasks included caring for thousands of British emigrants as well as founding the Church Emigration Society.

Cooper had to resign and return to England in 1889, in consequence of his wife's illness. Mrs Cooper died in 1891. Soon after Anna's death he must have met and married his second wife,
Evelyn Mary Faithfull - (Birth 13 NOV 1857 • Horsmonden, Kent, England & Death 3 AD 1936 • Worthing, Sussex, England) daughter of Revered George Faithfull 1828-1900

St Luke's Hostel and the Homes of St Barnabas
In 1892, the newly married couple began the two tasks that were to occupy the next eight years of their lives; the founding of St Luke's Hospital and the Homes of St Barnabas. By 1894 the St Luke's Hostel and Nursing Home was established governed by the council. He then went on to lay particular stress on something that had been in Cooper's mind from the beginning, namely that convalescent homes might eventually be provided in the country. The idea of forming a community of retired Anglican clergy began in the mind of Cooper around 1890. While visiting on the south coast, he and a friend discovered dozens of retired priests, without any income, living in workhouses. He determined to do something, and set about the task of founding a new community, of which he was to become the first Warden.

St Luke's Council however, felt they should concentrate on establishing the hostel itself on a firm basis before attempting to extend the scheme. There can be little doubt that this decision was the primary cause of Cooper's resignation as secretary in 1895. He made up his mind to go ahead and with his rich and powerful friends, he would create such an institution independently of St Luke's. It was several years before Cooper secured agreement to rent a house in Dormans Park, Surrey, and the first resident was admitted in 1895. As the number of residents increased another house was rented and "The Homes of St Barnabas" were born.

The time had come for a permanent home for the community. Cooper set about raising the funds to realise his vision, and, after substantial contributions were pledged, the present estate of some nine acres was purchased. He chose the site partly because of its mild climate and beautiful surroundings and partly because it is adjacent to Dormans railway station and so within easy reach of London. The foundation stone of the building was laid in July 1900 and the West wing and administrative block were opened the following year. Over time the buildings continued to be developed with the addition of the East wing and an extension to the chapel.

By 1977, it was accepted that the original name was inadequate. It did not reflect the collegiate nature of the community's lifestyle, neither did it do justice to the study in which many of the residents continued to be engaged. So it was that the name was changed to become The College of St Barnabas. In the second century of its life, the college is still functioning and is now furnished with modern amenities such as broadband internet connections in residents' rooms. The development has seen the substantial upgrading of the nursing wing from a ward to individual private rooms, the cloisters to include en suite facilities, and the addition of further rooms for residential care. One of its better known residents was the Reverend Dr. John Stott, a leader of the worldwide evangelical movement.

After establishing the Homes of St Barnabas, Cooper and his wife sailed once more to Australia where he served for four years. Then, returning to England he was appointed chaplain to the Lansdowne Hospital in Bath. There he remained for two years, before finally retiring to "Montpelier", North Street, Worthing. In the spring of 1909, he fell seriously ill and at his own request, was taken to St Luke's hostel, where he died on 13 April, aged 75 years. His remains were cremated at Golders Green. Mrs Cooper continued to live at "Montpelier" for some years after her husband's death, dying on 3 DEC 1936 • Worthing, Sussex, England

A. Tindal Hart notes in his memoir: 
"Curiously enough, unlike other social reformers of this period, such as Dr Barnardo, his pioneering work in that field has gone largely unnoticed. There was little mention of it in the public media of the day, and no worthy obituary notices were forthcoming. Certainly there has never been a biography. It is to be hoped that this Memoir may at least do something to remedy the omission".

References

Sources
A Memoir by A. Tindal Hart, Printed by the Further Education Unit, Lingfield
Crockford's Clerical Directory
Early annual reports of St Luke's Hospital, London
Early annual reports of the College of St Barnabas, Lingfield, Surrey
Testimonials from Archbishop Benson's papers at Lambeth Palace
SPG Minutes
Kelly's Directory of Sussex
Burke's Landed Gentry
Canon William Cooper's few letters
Articles in Mission Field and The Church Times
Notices of his death in The Times and The Manchester Guardian

Further reading
Hart, A. Tindal (1990) Some Forty Years Personal Relationships at the Homes of St. Barnabas (now the College of St. Barnabas) from 1899 to 1940. Ebor Press
--do.-- (1992) A History of the College of St Barnabas. Vol. 2: The next forty years, 1941 to 1980. York: William Sessions

External links 
 History of the College of St Barnabas
 St Luke's Healthcare for the Clergy

19th-century English Anglican priests
1830s births
1909 deaths
Anglican missionaries in Australia
Anglican missionaries in New Zealand
Anglican missionaries in Canada